Bhai Jodh Singh (1882–1981) was a Sikh theologian, author, mentor and social activist. He played an important role in the Singh Sabha movement. He was a recipient of the civilian honour of the Padma Bhushan.

See also
 Sikhism

References

External links
Bhai Jodh Singh materials in the South Asian American Digital Archive (SAADA)
Bhai Jodh Singh biography

1882 births
1981 deaths
Indian theologians
Indian Sikhs
Recipients of the Padma Bhushan in literature & education
20th-century Indian scholars
Singh Sabha movement